Gauramai is a village in Qadar Chowk Block, Budaun district, Uttar Pradesh, India. Its village code is 128624. The village is administrated by Gram Panchayat. Budaun railway station is 21 km away from the village. According to 2011 Census of India, the total population of the village is 2,845, out of 1,501 are males and 1,344 are females.

References

Villages in Budaun district